Ben Sherman is a British clothing brand selling shirts, sweaters, suits, outerwear, shoes and accessories predominantly for men. Ben Sherman designs sometimes feature the Royal Air Force roundel which is often called the mod target. In its beginnings in the 1960s, the company made its mark with fashionable short sleeved, button-down collared shirts.

History
The company was founded in 1963 by Arthur Benjamin Sugarman (1925–1987), the son of a Jewish salesman, born in Brighton. He emigrated to the United States in 1946, via Canada, where he later became a naturalised US citizen. He married the daughter of a Californian clothes producer and later returned to Brighton, where he established a shirt factory at 21 Bedford Square in 1963.

Sugarman had realised that early 1960s London-based modern jazz fans were eagerly buying the Oxford-collared American button-down shirt brands such as Brooks Brothers, Arrow, and Hathaway, that were worn by visiting American jazz artists including Miles Davis, Dizzy Gillespie, and Canadian jazz artist Oscar Peterson. At the time, these were only available from official importers who had, in effect, cornered this market. He decided to produce a version of these shirts, along with a collection of the colourful, resort-wear vacation clothes that were growing in popularity, in both the U.S. and Mediterranean Europe.  

Mods embraced the brand, especially as Sugarman was using higher-quality materials and stitching detail than the imported shirts. 

The Ben Sherman Originals label was created, and by 1965, the company had opened a small office on the upper floors of an office-block in a London backstreet. This acted as the showroom for their shirt and beachwear collections. The first Ben Sherman store was opened on Brighton's Duke Street in 1967.

Ben Sherman remained popular in the late 70s and early 80s as acts including The Jam, The Specials and Madness helped the brand appeal to the mod revival and rude boy movements.

In later years Benjamin Sugarman sold his business in 1975 and retired to Australia. The company passed through a number of hands in the following years. In 1993, British investor 3i backed a management buyout of Ben Sherman Limited from Northern Ireland-based Dunkeld fashion group, then in receivership, for £4 million which resulted in the creation of the Sherman Cooper Group. 

In 2000, 3i financed a second management-buyout that created Ben Sherman PLC. In mid-2004, Oxford Industries Inc. of Atlanta purchased the Ben Sherman brand for £80 million (then US $146 million) from 3i and Irish venture capital company Enterprise Equity.

In October 2009, Ben Sherman opened a store at 39 Savile Row. 

Oxford Industries Inc. completed the sale of Ben Sherman to Marquee Brands, controlled by the US investment group Neuberger Berman for £41m in 2015. In turn, UK operations were licensed out to The Baird Group (BMB Clothing).

At the 2021 Tokyo Olympics, Team GB’s opening ceremony outfits were designed by Ben Sherman creative director Mark Williams. Drawing on the Mod heritage of the brand, athletes wore civilian Harrington jackets and button-down shirts.

References

External links

British brands
Shoe companies of the United Kingdom
Clothing brands of the United Kingdom
Clothing companies established in 1963
English brands
Clothing companies of England
Clothing retailers of England
1963 establishments in England
1960s fashion
1970s fashion
1980s fashion